Sinfonia (plural sinfonie) is the Italian word for symphony, from the Latin symphonia, in turn derived from Ancient Greek συμφωνία symphōnia (agreement or concord of sound), from the prefix σύν (together) and ϕωνή (sound). In English it most commonly refers to a 17th- or 18th-century orchestral piece used as an introduction, interlude, or postlude to an opera, oratorio, cantata, or suite (who gives the origin of the word as Italian) . The word is also found in other Romance languages such as Spanish or Portuguese. 

In the Middle Ages down to as late as 1588, it was also the Italian name for the hurdy-gurdy . Johann Sebastian Bach used the term for his keyboard compositions also known as Three-part Inventions, and after about 1800, the term, when in reference to opera, meant "Overture" .

In George Frideric Handel's oratorio Messiah (HWV 56), "Overture to the Messiah" (French Overture in E minor) was originally titled "Sinfony".

In the 20th and 21st centuries it is found in the names of some chamber orchestras, such as the Northern Sinfonia .

Sinfonias in the vocal works by Johann Sebastian Bach

The opening movements of cantatas BWV 31 and BWV 182 are named "sonata" and the first movement of cantata BWV 106 "sonatina". Sinfonia in D major, BWV 1045 is considered a sinfonia of a lost cantata, because its manuscript indicates that the piece had four vocal parts.

Symphony with an alternative scope

Examples of such "sinfonias" composed after the classical era include:
Vincent d'Indy wrote a Sinfonia brevis de bello Gallico, Latin for: "Short Symphony about the War in Gaul".
 Igor Stravinsky titled the first movement of his 1923 Octet "Sinfonia".

See also
Sinfonia concertante
Sinfonietta (symphony)
Phi Mu Alpha Sinfonia
Overture

Sources

References

External links
 A selection of sinfonias (from the Mutopia project)

Symphonies
Renaissance music
Baroque music
Classical period (music)